Kelly Linden Mittendorf (born June 14, 1994) is an American fashion model and PR coordinator.

Early life 
Mittendorf was born and raised in Scottsdale, Arizona. She left high school after booking a Prada ad when she was 16 (she received the call during math class).

Career 

Mittendorf debuted in the Fall 2011/2012 advertising campaigns for Prada, and with runway appearances for Anna Sui, Giles, Loewe, Mulberry, Topshop, and most notably closing the Spring 2012 Marc Jacobs show.

Mittendorf has been featured in magazines including British Vogue, Vogue Italia,  Marie Claire (USA, China, Hong Kong), i-D, L'Officiel, Harper's Bazaar (Thailand, China), Love, Dazed, V Magazine, and Elle (Mexico, Malaysia).

Mittendorf mostly retired in 2015.

Personal life 
Mittendorf describes herself as an advocate of models' rights.

She studied mass communication and media studies at Arizona State University.

Mittendorf lived in Bushwick, Brooklyn.

References

American female models
Living people
1994 births
People from Scottsdale, Arizona
People from Bushwick, Brooklyn
21st-century American women